UHN or Uhn can refer to:

 University Health Network
 Uhn, the symbol for the chemical element Unhexnilium